The name Wayne's World might refer to:

Wayne's World franchise
 Wayne's World - A popular recurring sketch in the television series Saturday Night Live
 Wayne's World (film) - A film based on the sketch
 Wayne's World (soundtrack) - Original soundtrack from the movie
 Wayne's World 2 - The film's sequel
 Wayne's World 2 (soundtrack) - Original soundtrack from the 2nd movie
 Wayne's World (video game) - A video game based on the SNL sketch

Television episodes
 "Wayne's World" (Shark) - an episode in the TV series Shark
 "Wayne's World 2: Revenge of the Shark" - another episode in the TV series Shark which continues the storyline of the first

Other uses
 Wayne's World - A feature of I'm on Setanta Sports with a puppet version of Wayne Rooney introducing a footballing term.
 "Wayne's World" - A song by Lil Wayne from the 2020 album Funeral.